Chudov (from чудо meaning miracle) or Chudova may refer to
Chudov Monastery in Moscow
Chudova, a river in Perm Krai, Russia
Chudov (surname)